, is an inhabited island located in the Sea of Japan, administered part of Sakata, Yamagata Prefecture, Japan. The island, 2.75 km² in area, had 275 inhabitants as of 2005. The island has no airport, and access is normally by ferry to the city of Sakata on the mainland. The islanders are dependent mainly on commercial fishing and seasonal tourism.

Geography
The island is mostly flat, with a gentle rise from the east coast to the west coast, the west coast is characterized by steep cliffs. The port facilities are therefore located on the east coast and along with most of the population. Due to the effects of the warm Tsushima current, the island has relatively mild weather year-round average annual temperatures of 12 °C; even snowfall of 10 cm is rare. The island is covered with evergreen deciduous trees, including Eurya japonica.

Important Bird Area
Tobishima serves as an important site for some 270 species of migratory birds. It, with neighbouring, and much smaller, Oshakujima, have been recognised as an Important Bird Area (IBA) by BirdLife International for their colonies of black-tailed gulls.

Climate

History
Tobishima has been populated for several thousand years, with archaeological finds from the early Jōmon period dated to 6000–7000 years ago. In the late Heian period, the island was controlled by the Abe clan, followed by the Kiyohara clan. In the Edo period, it was part of the holdings of the Sakai clan at Shonai Domain and an occasional port for the kitamaebune coastal trading vessels.

As of April 1950, the village of Tobishima and thus the island was annexed by the city of Sakata, Yamagata.

References

National Geospatial Intelligence Agency (NGIA). Prostar Sailing Directions 2005 Japan Enroute. Prostar Publications (2005).

External links 
Official home page

Islands of Yamagata Prefecture
Islands of the Sea of Japan
Sakata, Yamagata
Important Bird Areas of Japan
Seabird colonies